Larasati I R Gading (born 14 November 1971, Stuttgart) is an Indonesian equestrian athlete. Gading represented Indonesia on international competitions since 2001. She won individual bronze at the Asian Games in 2014 and won double gold during the SEA-Games in 2011 and 2015. She is the most successful dressage rider for Indonesia in history and is also coach and judge in Eventing and Dressage on international level. Before starting her career as professional equestrian athlete at the age of 27, Gading was an international model and brand ambassador for an Indonesian cosmetic brand.

In 2018, Gading married the German businessman and entrepreneur Andy Todzi. She is fluent in English, German, Indonesian, French, Dutch and Italian.

Magazine Cover 
 Femina Magazine, 26 June-2 July 1997, 27 November-3 December 1997, 15–21 March 2001, 7–13 March 2002

 Matra Magazine, #101, December 1994.

Trivia 
 Larasati Gading was chosen as the Brand Ambassador Sariayu from year 1995 to 1999

References

1971 births
Living people
Indonesian equestrians
Indonesian dressage riders
Sportspeople from Stuttgart
Asian Games bronze medalists for Indonesia
Asian Games medalists in equestrian
Equestrians at the 2014 Asian Games
Equestrians at the 2018 Asian Games
Medalists at the 2014 Asian Games
Competitors at the 2001 Southeast Asian Games
Competitors at the 2007 Southeast Asian Games
Competitors at the 2011 Southeast Asian Games
Competitors at the 2015 Southeast Asian Games
Southeast Asian Games medalists in equestrian
Southeast Asian Games gold medalists for Indonesia
Southeast Asian Games silver medalists for Indonesia
Southeast Asian Games bronze medalists for Indonesia
20th-century Indonesian people
21st-century Indonesian people